Chimenti is an Italian surname. Notable people with the surname include:

Antonio Chimenti, Italian footballer goalkeeper
Jeff Chimenti, American musician
Chimenti Camicia, Italian renaissance period artist
Jacopo da Empoli, born as Jacopo Chimenti

Italian-language surnames